The Last of Mrs. Cheyney is a 1925 play by British playwright Frederick Lonsdale. A popular success in London, it was adapted four times as a film, three times in the United States from 1929 to 1951, and the last, in 1961, as a German production.

Play
Frederick Lonsdale's play, about a jewel thief who passes herself off as a society lady, opened at the St. James's Theatre in London on 22 September 1925 and ran for 514 performances. Reviewing the opening night for The Sunday Times, critic James Agate wrote: "It is not a good sort of play, but it is a very good play of its sort." It was included in Burns Mantle's The Best Plays of 1925–1926.

Movie adaptations
The first movie version of The Last of Mrs. Cheyney was released in 1929 in the United States, starring Norma Shearer and Basil Rathbone. It was nominated for an Academy Award in 1930 for Best Writing, Achievement for Hanns Kräly.

A second movie adaptation of the same name was released in 1937, starring Joan Crawford, William Powell, Robert Montgomery, Benita Hume and Frank Morgan.

The final American movie version of the Lonsdale play starred Greer Garson and was titled The Law and the Lady (1951).

A German film version was released as The Last of Mrs. Cheyney (1961), starring Lilli Palmer.

Notes

External links
 
 

1946 Theatre Guild on the Air radio adaptation of play at Internet Archive

Broadway plays
1925 plays
Plays by Frederick Lonsdale
British plays adapted into films
West End plays